Sajjad Moshkelpour (born 4 August 1990) is an Iranian footballer who plays for Hanoi FC in the V.League 1.

Club career
Moshkelpour had been with Sanat Naft from 2009 to 2013. After Sanat Naft's relegation, Moshkelpour joined Saipa with a two years contract. Coach Engin Firat transferred the unknown Moshkelpour to Saipa and made him to one of the best defender in the League.

Club career statistics

International career
In 2010, Moshkelpour was selected to participate in Iran U-23 football team's training camp in Poland.

References

1990 births
Living people
Iranian footballers
Sanat Naft Abadan F.C. players
Saipa F.C. players
Khooneh be Khooneh players
Paykan F.C. players
Hanoi FC players
Azadegan League players
Persian Gulf Pro League players
V.League 1 players
Iranian expatriate footballers
Iranian expatriate sportspeople in Vietnam
Expatriate footballers in Vietnam
Association football central defenders
People from Shadegan
Sportspeople from Khuzestan province